Skylar or Skyler is a unisex given name, a variant spelling of Schuyler. It may also refer to:

Arts and entertainment 
 Skylar, ska and reggae band formed by members of the group Howards Alias
 Skylar (album), 2006 album by the band
 Skylar (1995) and its sequel Skylar in Yankeeland (1997), novels by U.S. writer Gregory Mcdonald

Fictional characters 
 Skylar Bergman, a character in the TV series Baywatch
 Skyler White, a character in the TV series Breaking Bad
 Skylar, a character in the 3D shooter game Cybermorph
 Skylar, a character in the 1997 film Good Will Hunting
 Skylar Adams, a character in the TV series Alphas
 Skylar Banes, a character in  Ubisoft's Anno 2070
 Skylar Deacon, a character in the 2000 novel Calling the Swan by Jean Thesman
 Skylar Sinclair, a character in the video game The Saboteur
 Skylar Stevens, a character in the television series Jericho
 Skylar Storm, a character in the TV series Mighty Med
 Skyler Dayton, a character in the TV series Stacked
 Skyler Morse, a character in the animated TV series South Park
 Skyler "Skye" Miller, a main character of the novel Thirteen Reasons Why, and supporting one in the 2017 Netflix television show's first and second seasons

People with the given name
 Skylar Astin (born 1987), American actor
 Skylar Diggins-Smith (born 1990), American basketball player
 Skylar Grey (born 1986), American singer, songwriter, musician, and record producer
 Skylar Little (born 1978) American soccer player
 Skylar Neese (1996–2012), American homicide victim
 Skylar Schneider (born 1998), American cyclist
 Skylar Thomas (born 1993), Canadian soccer player
 Skylar Thompson (born 1997), American football player
 Skylar Deleon (born 1979), American convicted in the murder of Thomas and Jackie Hawks
 Skylar Neil (1991–1995), daughter of musician Vince Neil

See also 
 
 Schuyler (disambiguation)
 
 Kyler, a given name

English unisex given names